Benő Káposzta (Budapest, 7 June 1942) is a former Hungarian footballer. He played for Újpesti Dózsa as a defender. He played 19 games for the Hungary national football team. Káposzta is most famous for playing in the 1966 FIFA World Cup.

References
 Ki kicsoda a magyar sportéletben? [Who's who in the Hungarian Sport Life], II. volume (I–R). Szekszárd: Babits Kiadó, 1995, p64., 
 Tamás Dénes - Zoltán Rochy. A Kupagyőztesek Európa-kupája története  (Budapest, 2000) 

1942 births
Hungarian footballers
Újpest FC players
1966 FIFA World Cup players
Hungary international footballers
Living people
Association football defenders